Isocupressic acid is a diterpene acid present in a variety of conifer needles.  It induces abortion in cattle.
It is found in all parts of the ponderosa pine (Pinus ponderosa), especially the needles. This gives its toxic and abortifacient effects. It is also present in the lodgepole pine (P. contorta), the jeffrey pine (P. jeffreyi) and possibly in the monterey pine (P. radiata).

References

Pinus
Carboxylic acids
Diterpenes